Dymonte Dominic Thomas (born November 30, 1993) is a former American football safety. He played college football at University of Michigan.

Professional career
Thomas signed with the Denver Broncos as an undrafted free agent on May 11, 2017. He was waived by the Broncos on September 2, 2017 and was signed to the practice squad the next day. He was promoted to the active roster on December 14, 2017.

On August 31, 2019, Thomas was waived/injured by the Broncos and placed on injured reserve. He was waived from injured reserve on January 10, 2020.

Post Professional Career 
Thomas is the owner and head-coach of his own sports performance training company, Dymonte Thomas Sports Academy where he focuses on providing individual, small group, and team coaching to help the next generation of athletes.

References

External links
Michigan Wolverines bio
Denver Broncos bio

1993 births
Living people
American football safeties
Michigan Wolverines football players
Denver Broncos players
Players of American football from Ohio
People from Alliance, Ohio